Full Circle is a 1984 romance novel by American Danielle Steel. It was adapted by Karol Ann Hoeffner into a 1996 television film starring Teri Polo. It is Steel's seventeenth novel.

Plot
Tana Roberts, coming of age in the turbulent 1960s, has ambitions of an important career. Her feelings about love and marriage have been shaped by her mother's role as a married man's longtime mistress.

Adaptation
Full Circle was adapted by Karol Ann Hoeffner into a 1996 television film starring Teri Polo, Corbin Bernsen, Erika Slezak, Reed Diamond, Eric Lutes and James Read. The film also featured Nick Wechsler in an early role.

External links
 

1984 American novels
Novels by Danielle Steel
Novels set in the United States
Delacorte Press books
American romance novels